Tureyevo is a rural locality (a village) in Nesterovskoye Rural Settlement, Sokolsky District, Vologda Oblast, Russia. The population was 5 as of 2002.

Geography 
Tureyevo is located 42 km north of Sokol (the district's administrative centre) by road. Kokoshilovo is the nearest rural locality.

References 

Rural localities in Sokolsky District, Vologda Oblast